Theodore (Ted) G. Robinson (May 17, 1923 – March 2, 2008) was an American golf course architect.

Born in Long Beach, California, Robinson was an undergraduate at the University of California in Berkeley and received a master's degree in planning from the University of Southern California in 1948. He established his golf course architecture practice in 1954 and continued working there for over fifty years. Robinson joined the American Society of Golf Course Architects (ASGCA) in 1973, served as president from 1983 to 1984, and ascended to ASGCA Fellow in 1995.

Robinson designed over 160 golf courses in his career, mostly in the western United States (including Hawaii), Mexico, Japan, South Korea, and Indonesia. He was one of the first golf course architects to promote the use of water as a significant hazard, incorporating waterfalls and other large green-side water features in his designs.  This work led to his nickname of "King of Waterscapes."

Robinson died at age 84 in Laguna Beach after battling pancreatic cancer. His son, Ted Jr., continues to run his father's golf design firm.

Selected Golf Courses (New)
National Golf Club - Fort Washington, Maryland (1965)
Old Ranch Country Club - Seal Beach, California (1967)
Marrakesh Country Club - Palm Desert, California (1969)
Lakewood Country Club - Oiso Machi, Japan (1970, 1973)
Pinx Country Club - Jeju Island, Korea
Rhodes Ranch Golf Club - Spring Valley, Nevada (1997)
Sahalee Country Club - Sammamish, Washington (1969), hosted the PGA Championship in 1998
Fairbanks Ranch Country Club - Fairbanks Ranch Country Club, San Diego, California (1984)
Simi Hills Golf Course - Simi Valley, California (1981)
Tuscany Golf Club - Henderson, Nevada (2003)
Tustin Ranch Golf Club - Tustin, California (1989)
The Fountaingrove Club - Santa Rosa, California (1985)
Westlake Golf Course - Westlake Village, California (1964)
Rancho Murieta South Course - Rancho Murieta, Sacramento County, California (1979)
Chapparal Country Club - Palm Desert, California (1980)
Desert Springs Golf Club - JW Marriott Desert Springs Resort, Palm Desert, California (1986)
Menifee Lakes Country Club - Menifee, California (1989)
Tijeras Creek Golf Club - Rancho Santa Margarita, California (1990)
Experience at Koele -Lanai, Hawaii (1990)
Sand Canyon Country Club - Santa Clarita, California (with son Ted Jr.) (1999)

Selected Golf Courses (Renovation)  
El Dorado Park, Long Beach, California,1962
Hacienda Golf Club, La Habra Heights, California, 1965
Everett Golf & Country Club, Everett, Washington, 1969
Los Coyotes Country Club, Buena Park, California,1970
Navy Golf Course, Cypress, California, 1970
Candlewood Country Club, Whittier, California, 1971
La Jolla Country Club, La Jolla, California, 1973
Riverwalk Golf Club(formerly known as Stardust), San Diego, California, 1976
Palos Verdes Golf Club, Palos Verdes Estates, California, 1977
Alondra Park Golf Course, Lawndale, California, 1978
Pauma Valley Country Club, Pauma Valley, California, 1983
Indian Wells Country Club, Indian Wells, California, 1984
Rancho Bernardo Inn, Rancho Bernardo, California, 1984

References

External links
ASGCA – Past President Ted Robinson dies at 84
American Society of Golf Course Architects page about Ted Robinson

Golf course architects
1923 births
2008 deaths
University of California, Berkeley alumni
University of Southern California alumni